Huilong station can refer to:
Huilong station (Chengdu Metro), a metro station in Chengdu, China
Huilong metro station, a metro station in Taoyuan, Taiwan